Carter BloodCare is a 501(c)(3) nonprofit organization that operates in approximately 50 Texas counties. It is one of the largest blood centers in operation in the United States. The organization is accredited by AABB (formerly the American Association of Blood Banks), and the Foundation for the Accreditation of Cellular Therapy (FACT); licensed by the Food and Drug Administration; and holds membership in the South Central Association of Blood Banks (SCABB), America's Blood Centers (ABC), Blood Centers of America (BCA), and the Alliance for Community Transfusion Services (ACTS).

Merlyn H. Sayers serves as Carter BloodCare's President & Chief Executive Officer.

History
In 1951, the J. K. & Susie L. Wadley Research Institute & Blood Bank was chartered as a nonprofit organization in Dallas, Texas. The original location was at 3600 Gaston Avenue. The organization then moved to 9000 Harry Hines Blvd. in Dallas and did business under several different names over the years. In 1957, Carter Blood Center was chartered as a nonprofit organization in Fort Worth, Texas. In 1968, the Wadley Research Institute & Blood Bank registered the dba name of the Wadley Institutes of Molecular Medicine. In 1982, the Wadley Research Institute & Blood Bank registered the dba name of the Cancer Center at Wadley and the Blood Center at Wadley 1989, the Granville C. Morton Hospital and Granville C. Morton Cancer and Research Hospital was formed as part of the Wadley Research Institute & Blood Bank in addition the dba name of the Research Center at Wadley was registered. In 1993, the Wadley Research Institute & Blood Bank changed names to BloodCare. In 1998, BloodCare merged with Carter Blood Center of Fort Worth creating Carter BloodCare with headquarters in Bedford, Texas (2205 Highway 121, Bedford, Texas 76021) In 2007, Carter BloodCare absorbed the Stewart Regional Blood Center in Tyler, Texas (Carter BloodCare became the surviving entity of Stewart Regional Blood Center).

References

External links
 Carter BloodCare

Non-profit organizations based in Texas